The On-Archa is a river in Naryn District of Naryn Region of Kyrgyzstan. It is a right tributary of the river Naryn. The length of the river is 75 km, watershed - 1570 km2, and annual average flow rate - 9.92 m3/s.

References

Rivers of Kyrgyzstan
Naryn Region